Psoricoptera kawabei is a moth of the family Gelechiidae. It was described by Kyu-Tek Park and Ole Karsholt in 1999. It is found in Japan.

References

Moths described in 1999
Psoricoptera